Amna Ilyas is a Pakistani film and television actress, and model. She is the younger sister of models Salma Ilyas and Uzma Ilyas. Amna began her modeling career at the age of seventeen, and a few years later, moved on to acting in 2013. She is known for her leading roles in several films, including Zinda Bhaag (2013), Good Morning Karachi (2014), Saat Din Mohabbat In (2018), Baaji (2019), and Ready Steady No (2019). Ilyas has also starred in a series of television shows including the romantic drama Tum Mere Paas Raho (2015).

Early life
Amna began her modeling career at the age of twenty in 2007. She began to pursue acting in 2013.

Career
In 2011 and 2012, she was nominated for Model of the Year (Female) at 11th Lux Style Awards and 12th Lux Style Awards and won the Best Dressed Female Award at the 11th Lux Style Awards and Best Female Model at the 14th Lux Style Awards.

Amna made her film debut with a leading role in the 2013 Meenu Gaur and Farjad Nabi's co-direction crime drama Zinda Bhaag alongside Naseeruddin Shah and Khurram Patras. The film proved to be a commercial success and was declared Super Hit by the box-office Pakistan earning her wide recognition and several awards and nominations in the Best Female Debut and Best Actress category (including Lux Style Awards). The following year, she appeared in critically and commercially successful Sabiha Sumar's drama film Good Morning Karachi. That same year, she featured in an item song "Kaala Doriya" for the Asad ul Haq's romantic comedy Dekh Magar Pyar Se.

In 2015, Ilyas had various projects at different stage productions. She acted in Michael Hudson's action crime drama film Driven, which revolves around the elite class of Pakistan, and almost entirely filmed in a vintage Mercedes W126 S-Class from 1978, with Javed Sheikh. She was also the female lead in the romantic comedy Gardaab, alongside Fawad Khan.

In 2018, Amna was slated to star in Saqib Malik's debut film Baaji. Filming began in the summer of 2018, and it was released the following summer in 2019. The film was considered incredibly bold by audiences and garnered critical praise nationwide. Ilyas played the role of Neha, a middle-class girl with big aspirations who suddenly becomes embroiled in the life of a veteran film star, played by Meera. The film was a commercial success.

In July 2019, her film Ready, Steady, No! debuted in theaters across Pakistan in which she played the lead female. Directed by Hisham
Bin Munaver, the film held a lot of witty humor and kept audiences in fits of laughter. The plot revolves around two star crossed lovers who decide to elope after being told they can't marry one another. Ilyas's character Raziya, was praised for her playful expressions and stunts.

Filmography

Films

Television

Music video appearances

Accolades

References

External links

 

1987 births
Living people
Pakistani female models
Pakistani film actresses
Actresses from Lahore
21st-century Pakistani actresses
Actresses in Urdu cinema